The 2018 Korea National League was the 16th season of the Korea National League, the third tier of South Korea's football league system. Each of eight clubs played four times against all other clubs in the regular season, and the top three clubs of the regular season qualified for post-season playoffs.

Teams

Regular season

League table

Positions by matchday

Championship playoffs

See also
2018 in South Korean football
2018 Korea National League Championship
2018 Korean FA Cup

References

External links

Korea National League seasons
2018 in South Korean football
2018 domestic association football leagues